Shishijimicin A is an enediyne antibiotic isolated from Didemnum proliferum. Isolated in 2003 it is part of the family of 10 member ringed enediyne antitumor antibiotic agents, which includes: namenamicin, esperamicin and, calicheamicin. Due to its high potency from cytotoxicity, Shishjimicin A is currently undergoing testing as a possible Antibody-antibiotic Conjugate (ADCs) cancer treatment. Laboratory tests indicate it to be “more than 1,000 times as toxic to cancer cells as the anticancer drug taxol”, also known as Paclitaxel, a prevalent chemotherapy medication. As such, theoretically, only an administration of a minuscule dose of the molecule would be necessary per each treatment. As shishjimicin A supply is scarce and the full extent of its side effects is not yet established, there is still a need for further biological and clinical studies.

Total synthesis 
The total synthesis of shishjimicin A was published by scientists at Rice University in 2015, led by K. C. Nicolaou. Using methodology from the previous isolation of calicheamicin, 21 total steps were conducted for the synthesis, briefly outlined below:

 Shishijimicin A undergoes deprotection
 Trisulfide formation with glycosidation
 Carboline disaccharide coupling

The total synthesis includes:

 Ketalization of tetronic acid
 Reduction with ethylene glycol and diisobutylaluminium hydride
 Asymmetric addition of anion with selective protection
 Aldehyde oxidation via Swern oxidation and oxime formation
 Intramolecular dipolar cycloaddition
 Selective control of diastereoisomer formation
 Removal of protection and completed oxidation
 Coupling with lithium (3Z)-3-Hexene-1,5-diyne triisopropylsilyl chloride with Knochel's salt (LaCl3·2LiCl)
 Acetylation
 Deprotection
 Oxidation

The goal of the synthesis is to create two complex intermediate compounds, trichloroacetimidate and hydroxy enediyne. These will be coupled to produce shishjiimicin A. Though this organic synthesis is challenging, its mapping allows for future contribution to research efforts. Further improvements of the coupling reaction are currently being studied. Practicality and synthesis variations of the complex molecule are essential to working alongside pharmaceutical companies to develop clinical trials and treatment options.

DNA-cleaving mechanism 
The DNA-cleaving mechanism that shishijimicin A

Shishijimicin A binds to the minor groove of double-stranded DNA (DsDNA) and where its β-carboline moiety intercalates into the DNA. The unbound linker regions of DNA in the process of interphase and metaphase are open to binding by binders such as shishijimicin A. These regions lack protective histone proteins throughout the eukaryotic cell cycle. This dsDNA cleavage visualized and low selection probability for sequences by shishijimicin A may attribute to its cytotoxic properties.

Shishijimicin A exhibits IS cytotoxic towards HeLa cells, where the IC50 values are in the range between 1.8-6.9 pM.

See also 
Calicheamicin
Esperamicin
Kedarcidin
Lidamycin

References 

Antibiotics
Enediynes
Beta-Carbolines
Tertiary alcohols
Amines
Ketones
Isopropylamino compounds
Carbamates
Methyl esters
Ethers
Phenols
Ten-membered rings